A list of films produced in Brazil in 1981:

See also
1981 in Brazil
1981 in Brazilian television

References

External links
Brazilian films of 1981 at the Internet Movie Database

Brazil
1981
Films